Ursinia anthemoides or solar fire is an annual, herbaceous flowering plant of the genus Ursinia, native to South Africa. It has yellow or orange daisy-like inflorescences. Fruits have both pappus and hairs, making the seeds easily dispersed by wind. 

It was first described by Carl Linnaeus in the 1759 10th edition of Systema Naturae.

References

External links
GBIF Occurrence data for Ursinia anthemoides
Weeds of Australia identification tool: Factsheet - Ursinia anthemoides. Queensland Government.
he

Anthemideae
Endemic flora of South Africa
Plants described in 1759
Taxa named by Carl Linnaeus